The Ministry of Information & Broadcasting  Wazarat-e- it-tila-aat o nashriyat (abbreviated as MoIB) is a Cabinet-level ministry of Government of Pakistan, responsible to release government information, media galleries, public domain and government unclassified non-scientific data to the public and international communities. The MoIB has jurisdiction for administrating the rules and regulations and laws relating to information, broadcasting and the press media in Pakistan.

Autonomous/semi-autonomous bodies

National Council of Arts 

PNCA is an autonomous body in the orbit of the Ministry. It was created by an Act of Parliament in 1973. PNCA is the Apex Cultural body functioning on a national level. The activities of PNCA are performed on the basis of policies framed by its Board of Governors headed by the Minister for National Heritage & Integration with 28 members.

National Institute of Folk & Traditional Heritage

Lok Virsa (The National Institute of Folk & Traditional Heritage) works towards creating an awareness of cultural legacy by collecting, documenting, disseminating and projecting folk & traditional heritage. Surveys and documentation of traditional culture is central to the objectives of the institute.

Pakistan Academy of Letters

Pakistan Academy of Letters was established as an autonomous organization in July, 1976. Its main focus on Pakistani literature and related fields.[1][2] It is the largest and the most prestigious learned society of its kind in Pakistan, with activities throughout the nation.

Shalimar Recording & Broadcasting Company Ltd
Shalimar Recording & Broadcasting Company Ltd. (SRBC), is an unlisted public limited Company, incorporated in 1974. Currently it is a recording and broadcasting company with 20 ATV stations in the urban centers of Pakistan.

It was originally perceived and formed as a recording company in 1974 with an objective to protect the interest of the Artists, poets, composers and others who were being deprived of their legitimate earnings and with the aim to release the recordings on cassettes and other mediums, which were in the national interest but not viable from the commercial point of view. It started the business with recording and manufacturing of the gramophone records in 1976.

Institute of Regional Studies

The Institute of Regional Studies (IRS) is an independent, non-profit research centre devoted to the study of the region around Pakistan: South Asia, Southwest Asia (Iran, Afghanistan and the Gulf), China, Central Asia as well as the Indian Ocean region. It also studies and analyses policies of major power centers towards South Asia.

The Institute was set up in March 1982. It is considered one of Pakistan's leading think tanks. The Institute covers a wide spectrum of research in foreign and internal affairs, economy and industry, science and technology, socio-cultural and security related issues and thus provides an in-depth understanding and objective analyses of regional and global issues.

Press Council of Pakistan

The Press Council of Pakistan is an autonomous and independent apex body which issue and monitor good standards of media practice.

Iqbal Academy Pakistan

Iqbal Academy Pakistan is a statutory body of the Government of Pakistan, established and a centre of excellence for Iqbal Studies. The aims and objectives of the Academy are to promote and disseminate the study and understanding of the works and teachings of Allama Iqbal.

Quaid-e-Azam Mazar Management Board 

Quaid-e-Azam Mazar Management Board is responsible for the ppkeep and maintenance of Quaid's Mazar and take decisions for Quaid's Mausoleum.

Statutory Bodies

Federal Land Commission
Federal Land Commission (FLC) is a statutory body of the Federal Government created in 1972. Federal Land Commission has been committed to the introduction and implementation of Land Reforms in the country. Federal Land Commission is performing its judicial functions as a Tribunal, sitting severally, provided with concurrent and revisionary powers.

Organizations

Aiwan-i-Iqbal Lahore

Aiwan-e-Iqbal` Complex is a monumental building constructed in Lahore to portray a semblance of Iqbal`s philosophical thought and message for Muslim Ummah by providing sustained financial resources for the Activating and the Projects of the Iqbal Academy Pakistan.

Quaid-i-Azam Academy

The Quaid-i-Azam Academy is an institution of the Pakistan Government to promote the study and understanding of the personality and work of Quaid-i-Azam Muhammad Ali Jinnah, his associates, the Pakistan Movement and of the various aspects of Pakistan.

Corporations

Associated Press of Pakistan

Associated Press of Pakistan (APP) is a government-operated national news agency of Pakistan. It is not associated with the Associated Press agency (AP).

Pakistan Broadcasting Corporation

Pakistan Broadcasting Corporation also known as Radio Pakistan provides broadcasting services for general reception in all parts of Pakistan through Home and External Services for the purposes of disseminating information‚ education and entertainment through programmes.

Pakistan Television Corporation

Pakistan Television Corporation(PTV) is a public and commercial broadcasting television network.

Attached Departments

Press Information Department

Press Information Department is the principal department of Ministry of Information & Broadcasting headed by Principal Information Officer (PIO). PID is working since 1947 with the mission to establish an authentic source for timely dissemination of information to people through all forms of media.

National Language Promotion Department

Sub-Ordinate Offices

Information Service Academy
Information Service Academy is civil service academy for specialized Training to Information Group Officers of civil service of Pakistan.

Urdu Science Board
Urdu Science Board (USB) was established in 1962 as the “Central Board for the Development of Urdu” through a resolution. The Board was renamed as “Urdu Science Board” in 1984.

The Board has published more than 800 books on different science subjects, dictionaries and educational charts. Urdu Science Board has developed Urdu Science Encyclopedia consisting ten volumes. It has been printed on fine art mate paper and contains colour pictures, diagrams and visuals. It is very useful for the students of secondary and higher secondary classes, teachers and researchers as well as general readers. A quarterly “Urdu Science Magazine” is being published regularly by Urdu Science Board since 2002.

Urdu Dictionary Board
Urdu Dictionary Board (Formerly Urdu Development Board) was established in 1958. It was created through a resolution which stated that Urdu Development Board would compile and publish a comprehensive dictionary of Urdu on historical principles, on the pattern of Greater Oxford Dictionary. The Board was also asked to undertake a number of other tasks for the development of Urdu.

Founded by Baba-e-Urdu Maulvi Abdul Haq who was first Chief Editor of the organization.

Authorities

Pakistan Electronic Media Regulatory Authority

PEMRA was established in 2002 to facilitate and regulate the private electronic media. It has mandate to improve the standards of information, education and entertainment and to enlarge the choice available to the people of Pakistan Including news, current affairs, religious knowledge, art and culture as well as science and technology.

Other Offices

Nazriya Pakistan Council Trust

Nazriya Pakistan Council (NPC) is a trust and a non commercial organization. Its advisory body is a board of trustees comprising eminent personalities of the country. NPC is also managing the affairs of the Aiwan-i-Quaid an institution which provides a platform to organize seminars, symposia and conferences on important issues regarding Pakistan and Islamic ideology in order to achieve the NPC objectives.

Quaid-i-Azam Papers Wing
Quaid-i-Azam Papers Wing was established in 1990 to publish papers of Muhammad Ali Jinnah.

See also 
 Government of Pakistan
 PEMRA

References

External links 
 

Pakistan
Mass media in Pakistan
Pakistan